Christisonia is a genus of flowering plants belonging to the family Orobanchaceae.

Its native range is Indian subcontinent to Philippines.

Species:

Christisonia albida 
Christisonia bicolor 
Christisonia calcarata 
Christisonia flammea 
Christisonia hookeri 
Christisonia indica 
Christisonia keralensis 
Christisonia kwangtungensis 
Christisonia legocia 
Christisonia mira 
Christisonia rodgeri 
Christisonia saulierei 
Christisonia scortechinii 
Christisonia siamensis 
Christisonia sinensis 
Christisonia subacaulis 
Christisonia thwaitesii 
Christisonia tomentosa 
Christisonia tricolor 
Christisonia tubulosa 
Christisonia unicolor 
Christisonia wightii

References

Orobanchaceae
Orobanchaceae genera